Penicillifera infuscata is a moth in the family Bombycidae first described by Wolfgang Dierl in 1978. It is found on Sumatra in Indonesia.

References

Bombycidae
Moths described in 1978